Maine Pyaar Kyun Kiya is a romantic comedy directed by David Dhawan. It is the adaptation of the 1969 English film, Cactus Flower. It stars Salman Khan, Sushmita Sen, Katrina Kaif and Sohail Khan, with Arshad Warsi, Beena Kak, Rajpal Yadav and Isha Koppikar in supporting roles. Arbaaz Khan made a guest appearance in the film. The film is about the relationships of a womanizing doctor who gets ultimately stuck between two women: a patient with suicidal tendencies and his nurse.

Plot
Samir (Salman Khan) is a very successful doctor: He not only looks after his patients' maladies, but he also looks after his female patients' hearts. Most women fall for him and his irresistible charms. The only person who has not fallen for him is his dutiful nurse Naina (Sushmita Sen).

Whenever a girl gets too close to Samir and starts talking about marriage, he sends her off by telling her he is already married. However, one day, he meets Sonia (Katrina Kaif), a beautiful young woman and Samir is smitten. He lies to her about having a wife, but the marriage is failing. When she learns of his 'wife', she wants to meet her. Samir introduces Naina, as well as her niece and nephew, as his wife and children.

Samir then arranges a fake divorce from his fake wife with the help of his best friend, lawyer Vicky (Arshad Warsi) who, despite having a steady girlfriend (Isha Koppikar), frequently flirts with Naina. To complicate things further, Samir's mother (Beena Kak) suddenly appears and doesn't want her son get divorced from Naina (when he isn't married to her in the first place). And then, there is Sonia's neighbour Pyare (Sohail Khan), who does not want Sonia to marry Samir: He wants Sonia for his own and she seems to like him, too.

The web of lies around everyone grows thicker and thicker, but finally, Samir is able to persuade Sonia to marry him. But before the altar, she makes him realize that she isn't the right wife for him; he is in love with Naina who has proved her love since she played along, pretending to be his wife. Samir agrees and rushes to the airport because Naina wants to escape to Canada, while Sonia marries Pyare. At the airport, Samir arrives in time: He convinces Naina to stay and she agrees.

Cast
 Salman Khan as Dr. Sameer Malhotra
 Sushmita Sen as Naina Kapoor
 Katrina Kaif as Sonia Bharadwaj
Sohail Khan as Pyare Mohan Singh
 Beena Kak as Anjali Malhotra
 Arshad Warsi as Vikrant "Vicky" Roy
 Isha Koppikar as Nishi Gupta
 Rajpal Yadav as Pramod Kumar Thapar
 Arbaaz Khan as Shrikant Sharma(Cameo)
 Dolly Bindra as Dolly Verma
 G. P. Singh as Judge Brahmadutt Gupta

Box office
The film grossed Rs.55 Crores. It also emerged as the fifth-highest-grossing film of the year.

Soundtrack

The soundtrack consists of 7 original tracks and 4 remixes Composed By Himesh Reshammiya According to the Indian trade website Box Office India, with around 1,250,000 units sold, this film's soundtrack album was one of The year's Best-selling.

Track list

Reception 
A critic from Rediff.com wrote that "In terms of its body and colour, Maine Pyaar Kyun Kiya is a sunshine romantic comedy. It has it all -- cool, summery colours, trendy hip-shaking music, rocking choreography, pretty looking actors and amusing banter". Taran Adarsh of Bollywood Hungama wrote that the film "is a Salman Khan film all the way. The good looking actor has specialized at aimed-at-gallery roles and his performance plus charisma is what makes the goings-on so pleasurable".

Awards

References

External links
 

2005 films
2000s Hindi-language films
Films directed by David Dhawan
Films scored by Himesh Reshammiya
2005 romantic comedy films
Indian romantic comedy films
Films based on adaptations
Hindi remakes of English films
Indian remakes of American films
Films shot in Mumbai
Films shot in the Maldives